The Bandy World Championship for women 2004 took place in Lappeenranta, Finland between 18 and 22 February. It was the first World Championship in bandy for women and is officially called the "Women's Bandy World Championship" by english speakers.

Five teams took part, and firstly, all teams played in a group series, where all teams played each other once. The four best teams continued to the semi-finals. All matches were 2x30 minutes, apart from the final, which was 2 x 45 minutes. Sweden became world champions, winning their six matches a total of 52-0. In the final-game Sweden defeated Russia, 7-0.

Participating teams

Venue

Results

Table

Semi-finals

Finals

Medals

References

External links

2004 in bandy
2004
Bandy World Championship
International bandy competitions hosted by Finland
 
Women's Bandy World Championship
Sport in Lappeenranta